For a complete list see :Category:Football clubs in the Gambia

A
 Africell Football Club
 Armed Forces Football Club

B
 Banjul Hawks
 Brikama United
 BK West United FC 
 BK West United FC Academy

G
 GAMTEL Football Club
 Gambia Ports Authority Football Club

I
 Interior FC

R
 Real de Banjul

S
 Samger Football Club
 Sea View Football Club
 Steve Biko Football Club

Ports fc
 Wallidan

External links
 RSSSF

 
Gambia
Football clubs
Football clubs